Peter Francis Straub (March 2, 1943 – September 4, 2022) was an American novelist and poet. He wrote numerous horror and supernatural fiction novels, including Julia and Ghost Story, as well as The Talisman, which he co-wrote with Stephen King. Straub received such literary honors as the Bram Stoker Award, World Fantasy Award, and International Horror Guild Award.

Early life and education
Straub was born in Milwaukee, Wisconsin, the son of Gordon Anthony Straub and Elvena (Nilsestuen) Straub. At the age of seven, Straub was struck by a car, sustaining serious injuries. He was hospitalized for several months, and temporarily used a wheelchair after being released until he had re-learned how to walk. Straub has said that the accident made him prematurely aware of his own mortality.

Straub read voraciously from an early age, but his literary interests did not please his parents; his father hoped that he would grow up to be a professional athlete, while his mother wanted him to be a Lutheran minister. He attended Milwaukee Country Day School on a scholarship, and, during his time there, began writing.

Straub earned an honors BA in English at the University of Wisconsin–Madison in 1965, and an MA at Columbia University a year later. He briefly taught English at Milwaukee Country Day, then moved to Dublin, Ireland, in 1969 to work on a PhD, and to start writing professionally.

Career
After mixed success with two attempts at literary mainstream novels in the mid-1970s (Marriages and Under Venus), Straub dabbled in the supernatural for the first time with Julia (1975). He then wrote If You Could See Me Now (1977), and came to widespread public attention with his fifth novel, Ghost Story (1979), which was a critical success and was later loosely adapted into a 1981 film starring Fred Astaire. Several horror novels followed, with growing success, including The Talisman and Black House, two fantasy-horror collaborations with Straub's long-time friend and fellow author Stephen King.

After a fallow period, Straub re-emerged in 1988 with Koko, a nonsupernatural (though horrific) Vietnam novel. Koko was followed in the early 1990s by the related novels Mystery and The Throat, which together with Koko make up the "Blue Rose Trilogy". These complex and intertwined novels extended Straub's explorations into metafiction and unreliable narrators.

The ambitious mainstream thriller The Hellfire Club was published in 1996. Mr. X followed in 1999 with a doppelgänger theme.  In 2001, Straub and King reteamed for Black House, a loose sequel to The Talisman tying that book in with King's Dark Tower Series.  2003 saw the publication of a new Straub novel Lost Boy, Lost Girl followed by the related In the Night Room (2004). Both of these novels won Stoker awards.

Straub also edited the Library of America volume H. P. Lovecraft: Tales (2005). His novel Mr. X had paid tribute to Lovecraft, as the eponymous Mr. X wrote in a similar style.

Straub published several books of poetry. My Life in Pictures appeared in 1971 as part of a series of six poetry pamphlets Straub published with his friend Thomas Tessier under the Seafront Press imprint while living in Dublin. In 1972 the more substantial chapbook Ishmael was published by Turret Books in London. Straub's third book of poetry, Open Air, appeared later that same year from Irish University Press. The collection Leeson Park and Belsize Square: Poems 1970 – 1975 was published by Underwood-Miller in October 1983. This collection reprints much of Ishmael along with previously uncollected poems, but none of the poems from Open Air.

A critical essay on Straub's horror work can be found in S. T. Joshi's book The Modern Weird Tale (2001). At the Foot of the Story Tree by Bill Sheehan discusses Straub's work before 2000.

Straub also sat on the contributing editorial board of the literary journal Conjunctions, and he guest-edited Conjunctions: 39, an issue on New Wave Fabulism.

In 2007, Straub's personal papers were acquired by the Fales Library at New York University.

February 2010 saw the release of what would be Straub's final novel, A Dark Matter.

In 2016, co-author Stephen King said that he and Straub had plans to write a third Talisman book in the future. King says that the collaboration for the series was "natural," and that the two were excited to work together. On Straub's contribution to horror fiction, King says, "he brought a poet's sensibility to the field, creating a synthesis of horror and beauty" and "he writes a beautiful prose line that features narrative clarity, sterling characterization, and surprising bursts of humor." Mid-2021, in a podcast with Dead Headspace, Straub described as unlikely that he would be able to keep up with Stephen King anymore, therefore it is very unlikely that he would co-write a third Talisman with Stephen King.

Personal life and death
In 1966, Straub married Susan Bitker. They had two children, Benjamin, and Emma Straub, who is also a novelist. The family lived in Dublin from 1969 to 1972, in London from 1972 to 1979, and in the New York City area from 1979 onwards.

Straub died on September 4, 2022, aged 79, from complications of a broken hip. At the time of his death, he and his wife lived in Brooklyn.

Bibliography

Novels
1973: Marriages
1974: Under Venus
1975: Julia
1977: If You Could See Me Now
1979: Ghost Story
1980: Shadowland (World Fantasy Award nominee, 1981)
1983: Floating Dragon (winner of the 1984 August Derleth Award)
1984: The Talisman (with Stephen King, winner of the 1985 World and Locus Fantasy Awards)
1988: Koko (winner of the 1989 World Fantasy Award)
1990: Mystery
1993: The Throat (winner of the 1993 Bram Stoker Award and 1994 WFA nominee)
1995: The Hellfire Club (1996 Bram Stoker and 1997 August Derleth Awards nominee)
1999: Mr. X (winner of the 1999 Bram Stoker Award and August Derleth Award nominee)
2001: Black House (with Stephen King, 2001 Bram Stoker Award nominee)
2003: Lost Boy, Lost Girl (winner of the 2003 Bram Stoker Award and 2004 August Derleth Award nominee)
2004: In the Night Room (winner of the 2004 Bram Stoker Award)
2010: A Dark Matter (winner of the 2010 Bram Stoker Award)

Short story collections
1990: Houses Without Doors (includes "A Short Guide to the City" and a shorter version of Mrs. God)
2000: Magic Terror (includes "Pork Pie Hat (novella)")
2007: 5 Stories; Bram Stoker Award nominee
2010: The Juniper Tree and Other Blue Rose Stories
2016: Interior Darkness

Novellas
1982: The General's Wife
1990: Mrs. God (collected in "Houses Without Doors")
1993: The Ghost Village (collected in Magic Terror) (winner of World Fantasy Award) (1993)
1993 Bunny is Good Bread (collected in "Magic Terror")
1997 Mr. Clubb and Mr. Cuff (collected in "Magic Terror")
1999 Pork Pie Hat (collected in "Magic Terror")
2010: A Special Place – The Heart of a Dark Matter (outtake from "A Dark Matter")
2011: The Ballad of Ballard and Sandrine
1990/2012: The Buffalo Hunter: A Novella (originally collected in "Houses Without Doors" in 1990)
2015: Perdido
2017: The Process (is a Process All its Own)

Poems
1971: My Life in Pictures
1972: Ishmael
1972: Open Air
1983: Leeson Park and Belsize Square: Poems 1970 – 1975

Non-fiction
2006: Sides (collection of non-fiction essays)

Anthologies (as editor)
2008: Poe's Children (2008)
2009: American Fantastic Tales (Two Volumes) for the Library of America

Omnibus editions
1984: Wild Animals (collects the novels Julia, If You Could See Me Now, and Under Venus)

Limited editions
2010: The Skylark (an earlier, longer draft of A Dark Matter)

Further reading
Hauntings: The Official Peter Straub Bibliography, Michael R. Collings
 Tibbetts, John C. The Gothic Worlds of Peter Straub. Jefferson: McFarland Publishers, 2016

Adaptations
Full Circle (1977), based on Julia (1975)
Ghost Story (1981), based on Ghost Story (1979)
The Talisman (2008 short), based on The Talisman
The Talisman (TBA), an upcoming miniseries based on The Talisman

References

External links
 
 
 
 BookBanter interviews Peter Straub (March, 2010)
 Database containing descriptive bibliography, publishing history, reviews, and literary criticism of King and Straub's The Talisman
 Genealogy of Peter Francis Straub
 NYU Press Release about Straub's papers
 Peter Straub Penguin Random House author page
 Peter Straub Papers, Fales Library and Special Collections at New York University

1943 births
2022 deaths
20th-century American essayists
20th-century American male writers
20th-century American non-fiction writers
20th-century American novelists
20th-century American poets
20th-century American short story writers
21st-century American essayists
21st-century American male writers
21st-century American non-fiction writers
21st-century American novelists
21st-century American poets
21st-century American short story writers
Accidental deaths in New York (state)
American crime writers
American expatriates in England
American expatriates in the Republic of Ireland
American fantasy writers
American horror writers
American male essayists
American male non-fiction writers
American male novelists
American male poets
American male short story writers
American mystery writers
American thriller writers
Anthologists
Columbia Graduate School of Arts and Sciences alumni
Ghost story writers
Novelists from New York (state)
Novelists from Wisconsin
American psychological fiction writers
Surrealist writers
University of Wisconsin–Madison College of Letters and Science alumni
Weird fiction writers
World Fantasy Award-winning writers
Writers from Brooklyn
Writers from Milwaukee
Writers of Gothic fiction